The A65/N65 is a motorway and an expressway in the Netherlands. It is located in the province of North Brabant, and connects the cities of Vught and Tilburg.

Route
The road begins as the A65 at the Vught interchange with the A2 and then goes to the Vught city center, at which point it becomes the N65. On the path of the N65 lie seven at-grade intersections with traffic lights, of which three are in Vught. At the Berkel-Enschot exit, the N65 once again becomes the A65. The A65 then has one more exit before it ends at the A58 at the De Baars interchange. For its entire route, the A65/N65 has four lanes, with two lanes on each side.

External links
A65 at autosnelwegen.net

Motorways in the Netherlands
Motorways in North Brabant
Transport in Tilburg
Oisterwijk
Vught